Via is a monotypic moth genus of the family Noctuidae. Its only species, Via vindicia, is found in Panama. Both the genus and species were first described by Harrison Gray Dyar Jr. in 1914.

References

Acontiinae